Koranna is a genus of cicadas in the family Cicadidae. There is at least one described species in Koranna, K. analis.

References

Further reading

 
 
 
 

Parnisini
Cicadidae genera